The Assistant Secretary of State for Public Affairs was the head of the Bureau of Public Affairs within the United States Department of State. The Assistant Secretary of State for Public Affairs reports to the Secretary of State and the Under Secretary of State for Public Diplomacy and Public Affairs. On May 28, 2019, the bureau merged with the Bureau of International Information Programs into the Bureau of Global Public Affairs, and the duties of the Assistant Secretary of State merged into the duties of the Assistant Secretary of State for Global Public Affairs.

History
The position was first created in December 1944 as the Assistant Secretary of State for Public and Cultural Relations. It was later changed to its current name in 1946. Initially, incumbents supervised the forerunners of the United States Information Agency and the Voice of America. Under the Presidential Appointment Efficiency and Streamlining Act of 2011, the Assistant Secretary for Public Affairs does not require Senate confirmation.

Historically, the Assistant Secretary for Public Affairs had a dual role as the Spokesperson for the State Department. From 2011 to 2015, the Assistant Secretary and the State Department Spokesperson were two separate roles held by different people. In late 2015, the two roles were once again merged with the appointment of Spokesperson John Kirby as Assistant Secretary for Public Affairs.

On May 28, 2019, the bureau merged with the Bureau of International Information Programs into the Bureau of Global Public Affairs, and the duties of the Assistant Secretary of State merged into the duties of the Assistant Secretary of State for Global Public Affairs.

Assistant Secretaries of State for Public Affairs, 1944—2019

References

External links
Official Website
Archived version of the 2009-2017 Website

 
Bureau of Public Affairs
1944 establishments in Washington, D.C.